Maurice Christopher Hollis, known as Christopher Hollis (2 December 1902 – 5 May 1977), was a British schoolmaster, university teacher, author and Conservative politician.

Life
Hollis was born at Wells, Somerset, in 1902, one of the four sons of George Arthur Hollis (1868–1944), vice-principal of the Wells Theological College and later Bishop of Taunton. He was educated at Eton and Balliol College, Oxford, where he was president of the Oxford Union Society and member of the Hypocrites' Club. He travelled as a member of the Union's debating team to the United States, New Zealand and Australia. At Oxford he met his lifelong friend Douglas Woodruff. He was a friend of Ronald Knox and Evelyn Waugh and in 1924 converted to Roman Catholicism, as Knox had already done and as Waugh did later.

For ten years from 1925 he taught history at Stonyhurst College, then from 1935 to 1939 was a visiting professor of the University of Notre Dame, Indiana, where he carried out economic research.

At the beginning of the Second World War, Hollis returned home and served throughout the war as a Royal Air Force intelligence officer.

Immediately after the war, he was elected as Member of Parliament for Devizes in Wiltshire and held the seat until he retired undefeated in 1955. While in the House of Commons, he showed an independent spirit, for example by supporting the abolition of capital punishment while that was not his party's general view, and was popular on all sides. When he left the Commons (to be succeeded by another Conservative, Percivall Pott) he became a parliamentary commentator for Punch and retired to Mells, near Frome in Somerset, where he spent his time in writing books and journalism and in supporting Somerset County Cricket Club and other local interests. He was also a member of the publishing firm Hollis and Carter, a subsidiary of Burns and Oates. In 1957 he briefly revisited Australia, in association with the Congress for Cultural Freedom.

Hollis wrote books and articles on a variety of historical and political subjects. His last book, Oxford in the Twenties (1976) is about his wide circle of friends, including Evelyn Waugh, Maurice Bowra, Harold Acton, Leslie Hore-Belisha, and the cricketer R. C. Robertson-Glasgow.

Family
In 1929, Hollis married Madeleine King, daughter of the Rev. Richard King, Rector of Cholderton, and herself also a Roman Catholic convert, and they had one daughter and three sons, including Crispian Hollis, Bishop of Portsmouth.

He was the brother of Sir Roger Hollis, sometime Director General of MI5, and the uncle of the academic  Adrian Hollis.

Publications
The American Heresy (1930)

The Breakdown of Money
The Two Nations: A financial study of English history (London: George Routledge & sons, 1935)
Thomas More
G. K. Chesterton
The Achievements of Vatican II (Knowledge and faith)
Holy places: Jewish, Christian and Muslim monuments in the Holy Land
The Monstrous Regiment
A Study of George Orwell (1956)
The Ayes and the Noes (1957)
Eton: a History (1960)
The Homicide Act (1964)
The Papacy: An Illustrated History from St Peter to Paul VI (1964)
The Oxford Union (1965)
Newman and the Modern World (1968)
The Jesuits: a history (1968)
The Mind of Chesterton (1969)
A Study of George Orwell the Man and His Works
The Church and Economics
History of Britain in modern times, 1688-1939 (The Ashley histories, 1946)
Death of a Gentleman
Glastonbury and England
Saint Ignatius
Evelyn Waugh
Our Case: What we are fighting for - and why
The Rise and Fall of the Ex-Socialist Government
Can Parliament Survive?
The Seven Ages: their exits and their entrances
Parliament and its Sovereignty (1973)
Oxford in the Twenties (1976)

References
Who Was Who (London, A. & C. Black)

External links
 
 

1902 births
1977 deaths
Alumni of Balliol College, Oxford
Conservative Party (UK) MPs for English constituencies
People educated at Eton College
Presidents of the Oxford Union
English Roman Catholics
Converts to Roman Catholicism
Royal Air Force personnel of World War II
UK MPs 1945–1950
UK MPs 1950–1951
UK MPs 1951–1955
Royal Air Force officers
University of Notre Dame faculty